Clapping, the percussive sound made by striking together two flat surfaces, as in the body parts of humans or animals
Gonorrhea, colloquially known as "the clap", a sexually transmitted infection caused by the bacterium Neisseria gonorrhoeae

 Music 

 "Clap" (song), a song by Hostyle Gospel
"Clap", an instrumental by Yes from The Yes Album"The Clap" (song), from High Risk Behaviour'' by the Chats

People
Margaret Clap or Mother Clap (died ), keeper of a homosexual brothel in London, England
Thomas Clap or Thomas Clapp (1703–1767), president of Yale College

Other uses
Clap skate, a type of ice skate used in speed skating
Clap (film), a 2022 Indian sports drama

See also
CLAP (disambiguation)
Clap Clap (disambiguation)
Clapp, a surname
Clapper (disambiguation)
Thunderclap (disambiguation)